Charles Anthony Tillman (born February 23, 1981), nicknamed "Peanut", is an American former professional football player who was a  cornerback in the National Football League (NFL).  He played college football at the University of Louisiana at Lafayette, and was selected by the Chicago Bears in the second round of the 2003 NFL Draft.

Tillman played 12 years for the Bears, helping them reach Super Bowl XLI, and also played one year with the Carolina Panthers, making Super Bowl 50 with the team, although he had been placed on injured reserve earlier in the season. He was selected to two Pro Bowls and was the Walter Payton Man of the Year in 2013. He was known for his cover skills as well as his ability to force fumbles by stripping or "punching" the ball away from players, with his well-timed punch of the ball commonly known as the "Peanut Punch".

After retiring from the NFL, Tillman joined the Federal Bureau of Investigation (FBI) in 2018.

Early years
Tillman was born in Chicago, Illinois, but spent a majority of his youth traveling around the world. His father, Donald Tillman Jr., a sergeant in the United States Army, was frequently stationed in different locations, ranging from United States to Germany. Tillman attended eleven different schools during his youth, but eventually graduated from Copperas Cove High School in Texas. During his time at the school, Tillman was a two-time All-District 8-5A and all-area team selection. The Austin American-Statesman and All-State Class 5A honorable mention named him to the Super Cen-Tex team

College career
Tillman attended the University of Louisiana at Lafayette, where he played for the Louisiana Ragin' Cajuns football team from 1999 to 2002. He started for all four years as a left cornerback after being a wide receiver in high school. His Ragin' Cajuns teammates included future Pittsburgh Steelers cornerback Ike Taylor.

Tillman graduated from ULL with a bachelor's degree in criminal justice.

Professional career

Chicago Bears
The Chicago Bears selected Tillman in the second round (35th overall) in the 2003 NFL Draft. He was the sixth cornerback drafted in 2003.

2003
On August 1, 2003, the Chicago Bears signed Tillman to a five-year, $4.32 million contract that includes a signing bonus of $2.05 million. Throughout training camp, Tillman competed to be a starting cornerback against Jerry Azumah. Head coach Dick Jauron named Tillman the third cornerback on the depth chart to begin the regular season, behind R. W. McQuarters and Jerry Azumah.

He made his professional regular season debut in the Chicago Bears' season-opener at the San Francisco 49ers and made three solo tackles and forced the first fumble of his career during a 49–7 loss. Tillman forced a fumble by Jimmy Williams during a punt return by Williams in the fourth quarter that was eventually recovered by Chicago Bears' long snapper Patrick Mannelly. On October 5, Tillman earned his first career start after he supplanted Jerry Azumah for the role. He made six solo tackles and deflected a pass as the Bears defeated the Oakland Raiders 24–21 to earn their first victory of the season. In Week 8, Tillman made eight solo tackles, deflected a pass, and made his first career interception during a 24–16 victory against the Detroit Lions. Tillman intercepted a pass by Lions' quarterback, that was originally intended for wide receiver Az-Zahir Hakim, and returned it for a 32-yard gain during the second quarter. On November 13, Tillman collected a season-high 11 combined tackles (nine solo), deflected two passes, and intercepted a pass by Marc Bulger in the Bears' 23–21 loss against the St. Louis Rams in Week 11. The following week, he made six solo tackles and made his first career sack as the Bears defeated the Denver Broncos 19–10 in Week 12. In a Week 15 game against the Minnesota Vikings, Tillman recorded an interception in the final minute of the game, where he snatched the ball away from Randy Moss in the endzone and prevented the Vikings from taking the lead and won the game for the Bears 13-10. Tillman completed his rookie campaign with a total of 83 combined tackles (76 solo), eight pass deflections, four interceptions, and one sack in 16 games and 13 starts. On December 29, the Bears fired Dick Jauron after they finished the 2003 NFL season with a 7–9 record.

2004
Head coach Lovie Smith named Tillman and R. W. McQuarters the starting cornerbacks to begin the 2004 NFL season. On September 19, 2004, Tillman collected a season-high 11 combined tackles (nine solo) during a 21–10 victory at the Green Bay Packers in Week 2. Tillman sustained a knee injury and was sidelined for the next eight games (Weeks 3–11). He finished the 2004 NFL season with 39 combined tackles (32 solo), five pass deflections, and one forced fumble in eight games and seven starts.

2005
In 2005, Tillman and Nathan Vasher were named the starting cornerback duo to begin the regular season. On October 30, 2005, Tillman recorded seven combined tackles (six solo), deflected two passes, and returned an interception for his first career touchdown during a 19–13 overtime victory at the Detroit Lions in Week 8. Tillman intercepted a pass by Lions' quarterback Jeff Garcia, that was intended for wide receiver Mike Williams, and returned it for a 22-yard touchdown to help the Bears defeat the Lions in overtime. On December 11, 2005, Tillman recorded eight combined tackles (five solo), deflected a pass, and made a season-high two forced fumbles during a 21–9 loss at the Pittsburgh Steelers in Week 14. Tillman forced a fumble by Verron Haynes and Cedrick Wilson during the game. Tillman was inactive as a healthy scratch for the Bears' Week 17 loss at the Minnesota Vikings. He finished the season with 93 combined tackles (82 solo), 11 pass deflections, five interceptions, four forced fumbles, one sack, and one touchdown in 15 games and 15 starts.

The Chicago Bears finished atop the NFC North with an 11–5 record in 2005, earning a first round bye. On January 15, 2006, Tillman started his first career playoff game and recorded six solo tackles and a pass deflection as the Bears lost 29–21 against the Carolina Panthers in the NFC Divisional Round. His efforts helped the Bears establish the league's best defense in 2005.

2006-2014
In 2006, Tillman was the Bears' leading tackler among defensive backs, recording eighty tackles. He also intercepted five passes (tying for a team high with Ricky Manning Jr.) and forced one fumble. One of the low notes for his season came when he missed the team's final games due to a back injury. Tillman was involved in a notable incident with Plaxico Burress before a prime-time game against the New York Giants. Days before the game, Giants' receiver Plaxico Burress claimed that the Bears' secondary was "average" and "very beatable". Tillman responded by holding Burress to only eleven yards and even intercepting a pass during the game. Many Bears' fans believe that Tillman should have been voted to the 2007 Pro Bowl, as he recorded more interceptions and tackles than DeAngelo Hall and Ronde Barber. Tillman helped the Bears reach Super Bowl XLI, but lost 29–17 to the Indianapolis Colts. Tillman had 11 tackles in the losing effort.

The Bears signed Tillman to a six-year deal on July 24, 2007. On December 8, 2007, Tillman was nominated as finalist for the prestigious Walter Payton NFL Man of the Year Award, which recognizes players who have performed extensive charity work.

On November 22, 2009, during a Sunday Night Football game against the Philadelphia Eagles, Tillman forced three fumbles in one game, two of which were recovered by the Bears.

During the 2009 season, Tillman recorded two interceptions, including one that was returned for a defensive touchdown. He recorded six forced fumbles, the second-most in the League. During a Monday Night Football game against the Minnesota Vikings on December 28, 2009, Tillman collided with Bears safety Craig Steltz while attempting to tackle Visanthe Shiancoe. The impact of the collision cracked some of Tillman's ribs and bruised one of his lungs. He was immediately rushed to the hospital, and released two days later. After the 2011 NFL season, Tillman was voted to his first Pro Bowl.

In Week 5 of the 2012 season against the Jacksonville Jaguars, Tillman passed free safety Mike Brown by setting the Bears franchise record for the most defensive touchdowns in a career with 8 when he returned a Blaine Gabbert interception for a touchdown. Tillman is tied with Donnell Woolford for the most interceptions by a cornerback in team history, trailing only safeties Gary Fencik and Richie Petitbon. He also has forced 36 fumbles, which is the most by a defensive back in the league since 2003.

On November 4, 2012, Tillman forced four fumbles against the Tennessee Titans offense, the most in a game by a single player in league history since the stat began being tracked in 1991. Tillman was considered by various sources as a Defensive Player of the Year candidate, competing with Houston Texans defensive end J. J. Watt. Tillman was named to his second consecutive Pro Bowl on December 26, making him the first Bears defensive back to be named to back-to-back Pro Bowls since Mark Carrier. He was later named to his first All-Pro team, placed on the first-team. Tillman finished the season with ten forced fumbles, which led the league, and his three interceptions returned for touchdowns is tied for the lead league with St. Louis Rams' Janoris Jenkins.

In the 2013 season opener against the Cincinnati Bengals, Tillman recorded two interceptions, the second time in his career he had two picks, after 2006 against the New England Patriots. Against the Detroit Lions in Week 10, Tillman tore his right triceps, and was placed on injured reserve with the designation to return, and could return by the playoffs. However, on December 16, Bears head coach Marc Trestman reported that Tillman will miss the entire season, playoffs included. Tillman concluded 2013 with 52.5 tackles, three interceptions and three forced fumbles. In February 2014, the NFL awarded Tillman the Walter Payton Man of the Year to acknowledge his charitable efforts and community outreach programs.

The Bears signed Tillman to a one-year contract extension in the 2014 offseason. Tillman suffered his second consecutive season-ending injury during a week 2 match-up against the San Francisco 49ers, when he re-injured his right triceps. Tillman leads the Bears in career defensive touchdown returns (9) and also owns the record for the most career interceptions (36) among all Bears' cornerbacks.

Carolina Panthers
On April 9, 2015, Tillman signed a one-year contract with the Carolina Panthers. Tillman recorded his first interception for the Panthers against Andrew Luck during the Panthers 29–26 victory over the Indianapolis Colts. He recorded his first forced fumble for the Panthers during their 37–29 victory over the Green Bay Packers. Tillman left Carolina's regular season finale against the Tampa Bay Buccaneers with a knee injury. MRIs confirmed on January 3 that Tillman suffered a torn ACL and missed the remainder of the season. On February 7, 2016, Tillman's Panthers played in Super Bowl 50. In the game, the Panthers fell to the Denver Broncos by a score of 24–10.

Retirement
On July 18, 2016, after 13 seasons in the NFL, Tillman announced his retirement from football via a three-minute YouTube video. He signed a ceremonial one-day contract to retire with the Chicago Bears on July 22.

NFL career statistics

Regular season

Post-football career
Tillman has expressed interest in working in law enforcement. In September 2017, the Chicago Tribune reported that he was training with federal agents at the FBI Training Academy in Quantico, Virginia. Tillman previously trained with law enforcement officers while playing in the NFL during the offseason. He gained the qualification a day before his 37th birthday.

Personal life
Tillman often makes appearances on Fox Chicago Sports shows. He also organizes, runs, and advocates numerous charitable functions. Tillman's Aunt Renee nicknamed him "Peanut", since his body resembled the shape of a peanut during infancy. Safety Mike Brown spread the nickname after meeting Tillman during his rookie year. He and his wife, Jackie, have three daughters and a son. In November 2012, Tillman stated that he might miss the Bears game against the Houston Texans in case his wife went into labor, but ended up playing the entire game. On November 13, Tillman and his wife had their third daughter.

Tillman's Cornerstone Foundation mission is to help improve the lives of critically and chronically ill children throughout Chicago. Tillman created the foundation after his second-youngest daughter was diagnosed with dilated cardiomyopathy, which resulted in a heart transplant.

Tillman has worked with United Services Automobile Association (USAA) as part of the insurance company's "Thank You" campaign, highlighting cooperation between the NFL and the military services.

In September 2019, Tillman rowed across Lake Michigan to raise awareness and nearly $200,000 for childhood cancer.

References

External links

 Official website
 Chicago Bears bio
 Carolina Panthers bio

1981 births
Living people
African-American players of American football
American football cornerbacks
Carolina Panthers players
Chicago Bears players
Louisiana Ragin' Cajuns football players
People from Chicago
People from Copperas Cove, Texas
Players of American football from Chicago
Federal Bureau of Investigation agents
21st-century African-American sportspeople
20th-century African-American people
National Conference Pro Bowl players
Ed Block Courage Award recipients
Brian Piccolo Award winners